Fault Tolerant Ethernet (FTE) is designed to provide rapid network redundancy. Each node is connected twice to a single LAN through the dual network interface controllers. The driver and the FTE enabled components allow network communication to occur over an alternate route when the primary route fails. FTE was created by Honeywell.

References

External links
Honeywell Fault Tolerant Ethernet Page

Computer networking